Shin Tsuchida (born 30 October 1990) is a Japanese politician from the Liberal Democratic Party who has represented Tokyo's 13th district in the House of Representatives since 2021.

He is the first member of the National Diet who was born in the Heisei era along with Yuki Baba.

References 

1990 births
Living people
21st-century Japanese politicians
Liberal Democratic Party (Japan) politicians
Members of the House of Representatives from Tokyo